The Deepwater trilogy is a series of science fiction novels written by the author Ken Catran for teenagers or young adults. The three books are respectively titled Deepwater Black (1992), Deepwater Landing (1993) and Deepwater Angels (1994). The books address a number of current issues like pollution, racism and politics. The most evident theme throughout the series is that of survival, not for oneself only but for a bigger cause. Other notable themes and elements include beauty, color and light among darkness (love and comfort in a time of danger), responsibility at a young age, the importance of the youth in the continued existence of the human race, rebellion, and fear of the unknown.

Background
How would you react if you were only thirteen or fourteen years old and one day you discovered your entire life that you had been living thus far is only a dream, or a pre-existing hallucination which is a memory from a person who had once been you? A person whom you had been cloned from, whose life you had been living until now.

What would you do if you woke up from that life and find yourself on a spaceship, hundreds of years into the future, millions of kilometres from Earth. No one is there to look out for you except an intelligent navigations computer named COL, a handful of unusual-looking teenagers like yourself and a god-like entity named NUN who had raised and educated you but at some point removed its presence for an unknown reason.

Welcome to the life of the crew of the spaceship Deepwater, a group of blue, green, red and multicolored youngsters, who find themselves past all known star positions travelling to an unknown destination, facing many unknown dangers, including themselves...

Deepwater Black
Robbie Mikkelson is an ordinary 13-year-old who goes to school, plays hockey and occasionally dodges the school bullies. He lives with his mom and dad, older sister Sarah and younger brother David. He goes to school with kids like Denie Miles, Meatgrinder and Reeboks. Everything is relatively simple until Yoona, the girl in the gray track suit, appears in his life.

This multicolored girl, whom no-one else can see, tells Robbie about things he doesn't understand, that he's needed on Deepwater. Before he can respond he's warped away from everything he's ever known, to discover that he is Reb, second in charge of a sky-scraper sized spaceship, the same person, yet different and told that his life on Earth is only a dream. He is now in charge of Deepwater along with Yoona, Bren, Gret, Lis and Zak, all of them descendants of colonists of the Solar System. Worn out from long shifts of duty in order to stay alive, these teenagers are fighting dangers like trites, amebs, solunks and mag-mets. Then there's also the 'Jel' a dangerous, seemingly live substance that lives deep in the ship's ventilation shafts. Robbie is now forced to live two lives, zooming back to Earth whenever the 'prexes' hit him, his Deepwater life becoming more and more real. To complicate things, distrust among the ship's crew slowly grows out of control and questions about their own identity are answered by only bigger riddles. Who are they really? Why are they alone in space? Where are they heading? What is hidden in the uncharted chambers of Deepwater? What is the mysterious, half-destroyed, dark ship that they encounter on their journey? Robbie has to answer Yoona's plea for help, but how can he when he doesn't even know who he is?

Deepwater Landing
The second book is the story of Denie Miles, who finds herself on Deepwater as Cei, having woken from one of two caskets that had remained closed in Deepwater Black when the other six opened. Deepwater had to return to space, searching for the one necessary ingredient to complete its mission. Enemies from the past return to follow her back to Earth, where a woman named Chibbi Orduna, helps her to get some answers. Across the gulf of space, there are even worse enemies waiting at their destination, who are horrifyingly not unlike themselves.

Deepwater Angels
Only one final casket has stayed closed till now. When Conn, an Earthkid, wakes to find himself on Deepwater, the spaceship is stranded on Earth. Life is beginning anew, however, Deepwater has to complete one final mission, right here on home territory. The danger is more overwhelming than ever. Mysteries need to be solved. Join Conn on his quest to re-establish life on a planet that is home, yet filled with perils, both alien and menacing.

See also

Deepwater Black

Science fiction novel trilogies
New Zealand science fiction novels
Children's science fiction novels
New Zealand children's books
Young adult novels
1990s children's books
20th-century New Zealand novels